No Bigger than a Minute is a 2006 documentary film about dwarfs in the media as well as filmmaker Steven Delano's own cathartic effort to deal with his dwarfism, something he ignored for almost forty years. Delano interviews actor Peter Dinklage, director Werner Herzog, and rapper Bushwick Bill as he deals with the question: If genetic engineering can weed out the condition, is that something we would want to do?

No Bigger than a Minute had its television premiere in 2006 as part of PBS's Point of View series.

References

External links
 P.O.V. No Bigger than a Minute - PBS's site dedicated to the film
 
http://archive.pov.org/nobiggerthanaminute/film-description/

2006 television films
2006 films
POV (TV series) films
Documentary films about the media
Works about dwarfism
2000s American films